Benjamin Vance Speas (born January 17, 1991) is a former American soccer player who previously played as a forward. Speas played for Columbus Crew, Minnesota United, Indy Eleven and North Carolina FC, before retiring on November 10, 2020.

Career

Youth, college and amateur
As a Senior at Cuyahoga Valley Christian Academy, Speas was the Eighth-ranked senior in the nation according to ESPN Rise.  He is also a Two-time Parade All-American and a Two-time NSCAA High School Boys All-American.  He also played six seasons for Everest SC (Hudson, OH) and one season for the Columbus Crew Youth Academy.

In 2009, Speas committed to the University of Akron. In his freshman year, Speas appeared in all 25 matches and finished with two goals and three assists and was named College Cup All-Tournament Team.  Akron finished the year unbeaten at 23-0-2, however they would eventually lose the College Cup final to the University of Virginia on penalties.  In 2010, Speas appeared in all 25 games and finished with two goals and three assists.  Akron would return to the National Title game and this time would come out on top after defeating top ranked Louisville 1-0 and capturing the school's first ever national title in any sport.

In July 2011, Speas transferred University of North Carolina.  In his first and only season with the Tar Heels in 2011, Speas started 25 of his 26 appearances and recorded seven goals and 10 assists.  One of the seven goals came in the College Cup final against UNC Charlotte, which also turned out to be the goal that won the National title for the Tar Heels.

Speas also spent the 2010 season with the Michigan Bucks in the USL Premier Development League.

Professional

Columbus Crew SC
Speas signed a multi-year contract with the Columbus Crew as a Home Grown Player ahead of the 2012 season. His debut didn't come until the final day of the season on October 28 as he got the start and went 64 minutes in Columbus's 2-1 victory over Toronto FC. His contract was not renewed following the 2015 season.

Minnesota United FC
In February 2016, Speas signed with North American Soccer League side Minnesota United.

International
Speas was a member of the U.S. Soccer Residency program in 2007.  He made 10 appearances for the U.S. U17 and scored one goal.  He was also called into both the U18 and U20 national team camps although he never made an official appearance for them.

Honors

University of Akron
 Mid-American Conference Regular Season Championship (2): 2009, 2010
 Mid-American Conference Tournament Championship (2): 2009, 2010
 NCAA College Cup Championship (1): 2010

University of North Carolina
 Atlantic Coast Conference Regular Season Championship (1): 2011
 Atlantic Coast Conference Tournament Championship (1): 2011
 NCAA College Cup Championship (1): 2011

Individual
 NCAA College Cup Most Valuable Player (1): 2011

References

External links

UNC bio

1991 births
Living people
American soccer players
Akron Zips men's soccer players
North Carolina Tar Heels men's soccer players
Flint City Bucks players
Columbus Crew players
Minnesota United FC (2010–2016) players
Soccer players from Ohio
USL League Two players
Major League Soccer players
NCAA Division I Men's Soccer Tournament Most Outstanding Player winners
North American Soccer League players
United States men's youth international soccer players
People from Stow, Ohio
Association football forwards
Indy Eleven players
North Carolina FC players
USL Championship players
Homegrown Players (MLS)